Victoria Lynn is an American actress, film producer, and voiceover artist. She most notably voiced and motion-captured Theresa in Kingdom Come: Deliverance, and is the starring actress and voiceover artist in Warhorse Studios's latest DLC for the game, 'A Woman's Lot.'

She appeared opposite Nathan Fielder in Season 3's 'Smokers Allowed on the Comedy Central show Nathan for You, and portrayed a religious mother in Netflix's Haunted.

Lynn was born in California and worked as a theatre actress, most notably with companies like The Laguna Playhouse, The La Mirada Playhouse and in pieces like Delusion: Lies Within and Gina Young's  sSISTERSs. She trained with The Groundlings in Los Angeles, the Neighborhood Playhouse in New York City, and at the London Academy of Music and Dramatic Art in London.

She is a supporter of animal rights, and is the co-founder of the production company Quantum Kitten.

References

External links 
 https://www.victorialynn.me
https://www.instagram.com/incertaspecie/

American voice actresses
American film producers
1991 births
Living people
21st-century American actresses